Lactobacillus jensenii is a  normal inhabitant of the lower reproductive tract in healthy women. L. jensenii makes up 23% of vaginal microflora that is naturally occurring. It is also found on the skins of grapes at the time of their harvest. L. jensenii is sometimes used in producing fermented foods.

Lactobacillus jensenii produces enzymes that cause hydrolase release from the liver. Hydrolase aids in the digestion of food in the upper gastrointestinal tract.

Lactobacillus jensenii and other Lactobacillus species that produce hydrogen peroxide, (most notably L. crispatus), have been correlated with a decreased rate of bacterial vaginosis, gonorrhea- and HIV-acquisition and pelvic inflammatory disease. A stable colonization with these species, as opposed to dominantly L. iners, is associated with better reproductive outcomes, e.g. a decreased rate of preterm birth.

Discovery
Lactobacillus jensenii was discovered by F. Gasser, M. Mandel, and M. Rogosa in 1969. Although sharing many characterization criteria, L. jensenii differed from the similar Lactobacillus leichmannii in a gel electrophoresis analysis of their respective lactic dehydrogenases. The species was named in honour of Sigurd Orla-Jensen, a Danish microbiologist and a pioneer of biotechnology.

Characterization
Lactobacillus jensenii is Gram-positive, rod-shaped, negative for catalase and oxidase, and anaerobic. The organism can grow on blood agar.

Morphology
Colonies of L. jensenii are circular, colorless, small, and translucent.

Infection
Bloodstream infection by Lactobacilli is rare but often fatal, with 30% of endocarditis cases caused by the genus resulting in patient mortality. While L. jensenii takes advantage of nonimmunocompetence in patients, immunocompetent cases have also been observed.

Treatment
In the rare occurrence of infection, L. jensenii can be treated with teicoplanin and meropenem.

References

External links
Type strain of Lactobacillus jensenii at BacDive -  the Bacterial Diversity Metadatabase

Lactobacillaceae
Bacteria described in 1999
Microbiomes